The Waipara Greensand is a geological rock unit found in Canterbury, New Zealand. It dates from just after the Cretaceous–Paleogene extinction event, the Thanetian and Selandian, around 61–62 million years ago in the early Palaeocene. It is well known for its fossils, particularly for containing the oldest penguins (Sphenisciformes).

Geology
The Waipara Greensand is a fine to medium-grained, richly glauconitic quartzose sandstone. It crops out throughout North Canterbury. It has been interpreted as having been deposited in a shallow marine setting under conditions of very slow sedimentation.

The Waipara Greensand are Thanetian and Selandian in age. The top of the Waipara Greensand marks the Teurian–Waipawan New Zealand stage boundary, which is correlated internationally with the Paleocene-Eocene boundary.

Fossils
The Waipara Greensand is only sparsely fossiliferous, but there are some significant discoveries made from this rock unit. There have been at least at least 16 neoselachian sharks found, including  Chlamydoselachus keyesi and  Centroselachus goord, as well as the enigmatic Waiparaconus, which is either a barnacle or a coelenterate, the remains of two species of proto‐penguin Waimanu and Muriwaimanu, rarely also fish bones and poorly preserved molluscs. Nanofossils include two key age‐diagnostic taxa, Chiasmolithus bidens and Hornbrookina teuriensis.

The majority of shark specimens were recovered from loose weathered material that accumulates at the foot of steep banks along the Waipara River. Gypsum often encrusts the teeth, making identification difficult.

References

Rock formations of Canterbury, New Zealand
Sandstone formations
Geologic formations of New Zealand